Killian Keane is a retired Irish rugby union player. He was born in Skerries, Co. Dublin, Ireland in August 1971.

Rugby career

As a schoolboy,  he was a member of the Skerries Community Games Rugby team which reached the All Ireland Final, losing to Regional (Limerick). He developed to the Skerries first team before being spotted by Frank Hogan who convinced Keane to join Garryowen RFC.

He played at centre for Garryowen and Munster, and also won one cap for Ireland in 1998 as a replacement in a Five Nations match against England at Twickenham.

Media work
Keane also provides co-commentary on United Rugby Championship matches for Setanta Ireland.

References

Munster Rugby players
Garryowen Football Club players
Irish rugby union players
Ireland international rugby union players
Living people
Rugby union players from County Dublin
Year of birth missing (living people)
People from Skerries, Dublin
Sportspeople from Fingal